"Out of My Bones" is a song recorded by American country music singer Randy Travis.  It was released in March 1998 as the lead-off single from his CD You and You Alone.  The song peaked at number two on the Hot Country Singles & Tracks (now Hot Country Songs) chart, while it was a number-one hit in Canada.  It was written by Gary Burr, Robin Lerner, and Sharon Vaughn.

Content
The narrator is having a hard time forgetting a lost love. He describes what he can do to get her memory "out of his bones" including wishing he had amnesia.

Critical reception
Deborah Evans Price, of Billboard magazine reviewed the song favorably, calling his vocal performance "powerful" and saying that the production is "full but not overblown." She goes on to say that the record should "remind programmers that the warmth and feeling in Travis' country baritone are among the format's most precious treasures."

Chart performance

Year-end charts

References

1998 singles
1998 songs
Randy Travis songs
Songs written by Gary Burr
Songs written by Sharon Vaughn
Song recordings produced by Byron Gallimore
Song recordings produced by James Stroud
Song recordings produced by Randy Travis
DreamWorks Records singles
Songs written by Robin Lerner